"Creative" was released in November 2008 as the third single from Leon Jackson's debut album Right Now. To promote the track Jackson appeared on the official BBC Children in Need 2008 show performing the song as an "exclusive" as this was the first time Jackson had performed the track. The song went on to debut at number 94 on the UK Singles Charts.

Release and promotion

The song was released in November 2008 as a digital download only through Syco and Sony BMG. To promote the song, Jackson appeared on the 2008 series of Children in Need where he performed the song in live in front of a studio audience as BBC Television Centre in London. This is known to be the only time that Jackson performed the track on national television in order to promote the release of the single.

Music video

The music video for "Creative" shows Jackson performing the song in front of a big band. Also, in the video Jackson is trying to impress a female which features in the video. Throughout the video the female does not pay much attention to Jackson but however towards the end of the video the female seems to pay slight attention to Jackson.

Critical reception

The BBC said:
 Creative is a sassy, rumba-rhythmed number where Leon soars above, hinting at his prowess in the boudoir, this is easily the most memorable original track here.

Chart performance

References

2008 singles
Leon Jackson songs
Songs written by Howard New
Songs written by Peter Gordeno (musician)
2008 songs
Syco Music singles